Michael Close (born 30 July 1994) is a former professional Australian rules footballer who played for the Brisbane Lions in the Australian Football League (AFL).

AFL career
From Harrow, Victoria, Close was drafted by Brisbane at Pick 32 in the 2012 AFL National Draft. made his AFL debut for Brisbane in the Round 1 match against Hawthorn in the 2014 AFL season. In October 2017, Close was delisted by Brisbane.

References

External links

1994 births
Living people
Brisbane Lions players
Greater Western Victoria Rebels players
Australian rules footballers from Victoria (Australia)